The Africa Movie Academy Award for Best Cinematography is an annual merit by the Africa Film Academy to reward the Best use of camera in a film.

References

Africa Movie Academy Awards
Lists of award winners
Awards for best cinematography